The Green Party of Indonesia (PHI) is a political party in Indonesia founded in 2012. The party follows green politics, and has close ties to The Indonesian Forum for Environment.

The Green Party of Indonesia has members in all 34 provinces. The party aimed to have been registered for the 2019 Indonesian general election, however, they did not reach registration in time and instead endorsed independents or members of other parties. The party seeks to be registered by 2021.

The Green Party of Indonesia has been supported by the Australian Greens as a part of the "Australian Political Parties for Democracy Program".

Presidium Council Centre
The National Presidium were serving time from 2021 to 2026.

References

External links
 Indonesian Green Party on Twitter
 Indonesian Green Party on Facebook

2012 establishments in Indonesia
Political parties established in 2012
Political parties in Indonesia
Green political parties
Pancasila political parties